The Best Footballer in Asia 2022, recognizing the best male footballer in Asia in 2022, was the 10th edition of the Best Footballer in Asia. Son Heung-min claimed the award on 6 February 2023. It was his sixth Best Footballer in Asia title in a row, and eighth title overall. The event was judged by a panel of sixty sports journalists. Son received thirty first-place votes, fifteen second-place votes, two third-place votes, four fourth-place votes, five fifth-place votes and finished on 256 points in total.

Voting
60 judges were invited to vote, including 40 representatives from AFC nations/regions which comprise Afghanistan,  Australia, Bahrain, Bangladesh, Cambodia, China, Chinese Taipei, Hong Kong, India, Indonesia, Iran, Iraq, Japan, Jordan, Korea Republic, Kuwait, Kyrgyzstan, Lebanon, Macao, Malaysia, Maldives, Mongolia, Myanmar, Nepal, Oman, Pakistan, Palestine, Philippines, Qatar, Saudi Arabia, Singapore, Sri Lanka, Syria, Tajikistan, Thailand, Turkmenistan, United Arabic Emirates, Uzbekistan, Vietnam and Yemen. The other twenty jurors were independent Asian football experts or from high-profile media outlets. Before voting, all judges were given a 25-player shortlist, but could choose other eligible players.

Rules 
Each juror selected their five best footballers and awarded them six, four, three, two and one point respectively from their first choice to the fifth choice. A trophy for the Best Footballer in Asia was awarded to the player with the highest total of points.

Tiebreakers
When two or more candidates obtained the same points, the rankings of the concerned candidates was based upon the following criteria in order: 

a) The number of first-place vote obtained

b) The number of second-place vote obtained

c) The number of third-place vote obtained

d) The number of fourth-place vote obtained

If all conditions were equal, the concerned candidates tied. 

If the concerned candidates were tied for first place, the award and the trophy were shared.

Ranking

References 

2022
2022 awards
2022 in Asian football